Arba'in is a Syrian town located in the Kafr Zita Subdistrict of the Mahardah District in Hama Governorate. According to the Syria Central Bureau of Statistics (CBS), Arba'in had a population of 1,400 in the 2004 census.

References 

Populated places in Mahardah District